José "Gacho" Torres (July 2, 1896 – December 14, 1963) was a Puerto Rican outfielder in the Negro leagues in the 1920s.

A native of Rio Piedras, Puerto Rico, Torres played for the Newark Stars in 1926. In two recorded games, he went hitless in six plate appearances. Torres died in Cayey, Puerto Rico in 1963 at age 67.

References

External links
 and Seamheads

1896 births
1963 deaths
Newark Stars players
20th-century African-American sportspeople